Acutaspis is a genus of true bugs belonging to the family Diaspididae.

The species of this genus are found in America.

Species

Species:

Acutaspis acuta 
Acutaspis agavis 
Acutaspis albopicta

References

Diaspididae